The Moved and the Shaken is the fourth book and first novel by Canadian author, politician and retired hockey player Ken Dryden. It was first published in 1993 by Penguin Books.

Plot and setting 
The novel is set in the eastern suburbs of the Greater Toronto Area, in the communities of Scarborough, Whitby and Oshawa. The story centers around Frank Bloye, an oil company employee dealing with the everyday realities of being a middle-aged, middle-class Canadian family man in the 1990s.

References
 
 
 

1993 Canadian novels
Novels set in Toronto